Sir James Gadesden Wainwright (1837–1929) was a governor, almoner and treasurer of St Thomas' Hospital in London, England.

He was a cousin of Richard Wainwright and grandfather of Richard Wainwright Duke Turner.

See also

List of people from London

External links
- Financial record of St Thomas' Hospital relating to Sir James Wainwright

1837 births
1929 deaths
People in health professions from London
Almoners